This is the discography of the American death metal band Deicide.

Albums

Studio albums

Live albums

Compilation albums

Video albums

Music videos

References

External links
 Deicide at Discogs
 Deicide at Rate Your Music

Heavy metal group discographies